The 2007 Rolex Sports Car Series season was the eighth season of the Grand-Am Rolex Sports Car Series presented by Crown Royal Special Reserve. The 15-race championship for Daytona Prototypes and GT cars began January 27, 2007 and concluded on September 15, 2007. Alex Gurney and Jon Fogarty shared the Daytona Prototype title, while Dirk Werner won the GT title.

Schedule
2007 marked the first time the Sonoma race did not feature the GT class. Phoenix was dropped in favor of Iowa Speedway, and Long Beach was dropped for Circuit Gilles Villeneuve.

Confirmed entrants

Season Results

Standings

DP 

† Colin Braun was suspended for the race in Sonoma by the GARRA for an incident during the race at Watkins Glen while on probation.

GT 

† Not classified due to failure to complete a green-flag lap.

References

External links
 The official website of Grand-Am

Rolex Sports Car Series
 
Rolex Sports Car Series